Edwin Borja (born 6 July 1958) is a Filipino former swimmer. He competed at the 1972 Summer Olympics and the 1976 Summer Olympics.

References

External links
 

1958 births
Living people
Filipino male swimmers
Olympic swimmers of the Philippines
Swimmers at the 1972 Summer Olympics
Swimmers at the 1976 Summer Olympics
Place of birth missing (living people)
Asian Games medalists in swimming
Asian Games bronze medalists for the Philippines
Swimmers at the 1974 Asian Games
Medalists at the 1974 Asian Games
20th-century Filipino people
21st-century Filipino people